is a Japanese manga series written and illustrated by Yasumi Yoshizawa. It was serialized in Shueisha's shōnen manga magazine Weekly Shōnen Jump from July 1970 to June 1976, with its chapters collected in twenty-seven tankōbon volumes. A 103-episode anime television series by Tokyo Movie was broadcast on TBS from October 1972 to September 1974; a second anime television series, titled The Gutsy Frog 2 (known in Japan as New Gutsy Frog), was broadcast on Nippon TV from September 1981 to March 1982. An anime film was released in March 1982. A ten-episode television drama aired on Nippon TV from July to September 2015.

Summary
While frog Pyonkichi is hopping in an empty lot in Nerima, Tokyo's Shakujii Park, middle schooler Hiroshi trips over a rock and squashes him. However, Pyonkichi is reborn as an imprint on the front of Hiroshi's shirt and now gives him advice and commentary on his life.

Characters

Because said shirt is Hiroshi's only good shirt, he is always forced to travel around and interact with Hiroshi. They are equally obstinate and gluttonous and are always arguing like siblings. He is capable of jumping around and forcing Hiroshi to come along with him. He possesses incredible strength, and through his arms and teeth he is able to lift extremely heavy objects. Hiroshi's mother treats Pyonkichi as her own child. Pyonkichi is attracted to females of all species; including cats, frogs and humans. His title comes from his frequent acts of "gutsyness".

The middle schooler who fell on Pyonkichi. He is never seen without his sunglasses, which he wears perched on his head. Though his school has a uniform policy, he is, for some reason, allowed to wear his one good shirt. He is not good academically or in athletics (except bowling). He frequently engages in duels with other boys including Gorilla-Imo. Hiroshi is recognised as the class comedian due to his mischievous acts, and consequently is scolded often by his teachers. His girlfriend is Kyoko, whom he stays with most of the time. Though he still does not miss an opportunity of seeing out other women, especially older ones. Pyonkichi and Hiroshi behave like siblings; encouraging, quarrelling and caring deeply for each other. Married to Kyoko in the Solmac advertisement series produced by the original animators.

Hiroshi's girlfriend. She is the daughter of a rather wealthy family, yet is a strong minded girl who will stand up for herself and participate in pranks despite being kind-hearted. She initially pretends to dislike Hiroshi, but harbours feelings for him since their first encounter, as she wants Hiroshi to propose to her on their first date. Becomes friends with him after he meets Pyonkichi, whom she believes is a cute shirt design. She gets good grades in school, and her hobbies include ice skating. Kyoko does not always respond to Hiroshi's advances, especially in the public, and is often linked with other boys. But at the end of the day it's a two way-street, as she is seen getting immensely jealous when Hiroshi is seen with other girls; and there is a mutual understanding with Hiroshi about them dating. She spends most of her time with Hiroshi, and is married to him in the Solmac advertisement series produced by the original animators.

Hiroshi's sidekick. Despite his diminutive size, he is actually only a year younger than Hiroshi, who he addresses as senpai. His girlfriend is Misaka. 
 / 

The school bully, and Hiroshi's rival for Kyoko's attention. Initially he spends most of his time bullying others and duelling with other boys, but gradually reduces the degree of his acts. Hiroshi and Gorira become friends later on, becoming partners in numerous pranks. He loves cats, and his family business is a fish shop. In the Solmac CM, he has taken over the fish shop.

Addressed as "Ume" by everyone, he is an earnest young man who works as a sushi chef. Having grown up at the local orphanage, he cares deeply for the children there and plays Santa for them every Christmas. He is very much in love with Miss Yoshiko, which puts him at odds with Mr. Minami. At the end of the original, Yoshiko and Ume-san are linked together. Repeated acts include teasing couples while delivering sushi and subsequently getting injured; and peeping into Yoshiko's classroom with the help of a ladder. 

The new boy at school, he is completely selfish and rude towards everyone. Umesaburo initially believes that Shimpachi's bad behavior is because his family is extremely poor, but it turns out that his family is actually rather wealthy and of high social standing.

The English teacher at Hiroshi's school. Both Umesaburo and Mr. Minami are in love with her, which annoys her.

Hiroshi's childhood sweetheart. It was she who gave him the sunglasses that he wears constantly. Kuniko is a flirtatious girl who charms all the boys, saving most of her attention for Hiroshi, which, naturally, does not sit well with Kyoko.

A teacher at Hiroshi's school. He references his 25 years' teaching experience in nearly every episode of the anime.

Another teacher at Hiroshi's school. He is constantly dueling with Umesaburo for Yoshiko's affection. He is proud of his car, the Buran-go, and often offers to drive Yoshiko around in it.
Mrs. Kaizuka

Hiroshi's long-suffering mother. Because Hiroshi's father is deceased, she is the money earner for the family, working as a tailor and seamstress out of the modest home where she and Hiroshi live.

Media

Manga
Shueisha collected its chapters in twenty-seven tankōbon volumes, released from February 28, 1971, to October 9, 1976.

Anime
A 103-episode anime television series (consisting of two segments of 15 minutes each), produced by Tokyo Movie and Asahi Broadcasting, was broadcast on TBS from October 7, 1972, to September 28, 1974.

An anime film, titled , premiered on March 13, 1982.

The original anime series aired in the United States on United Television Broadcasting (UTB) in 2014.

Other media
In 2013, an American TV-movie remake of The Gutsy Frog was reported to be in development, presumably as a pilot for a new TV series. The pilot film was to contain both live action and CGI animation and to feature a cast including Frankie Jonas as "Frankie" (Hiroshi) as well as Maxwell Perry Cotton, Mischa Barton, and others, and features both American and Japanese names among the production staff although TMS is not reported to be involved in the remake.

A live-action dorama version of the story premiered in Japan in July 2015 on Nippon TV. The series is set in 2015 Japan and features a grown-up Hiroshi and Kyoko and a computer-generated Pyonkichi. The cast included Kenichi Matsuyama as Hiroshi and former AKB48 singer Atsuko Maeda as Kyoko.

A sequel manga in collaboration with Sanrio and written and drawn by Yasumi's daughter Yuuko Ootsuki, called Dokonjō!! Kero Kero Keroppi is about the daughter of Hiroshi named Hiroko and Keroppi in a situation similar to Pyonkichi

Reception
In 2005, Japanese television network TV Asahi conducted a "Top 100" nationwide survey; The Gutsy Frog placed 100th. In 2006, TV Asahi conducted an online poll for the top one hundred anime, and The Gutsy Frog placed 56th in the "Celebrity List". In 2013, animator Masaaki Yuasa recommended among other anime, The Gutsy Frog, highlighting episodes 145 and 146.

References

External links
  
 Manga-bank Office Yasui / The copyright source of the Gutsy Frog 
 The Gutsy Frog at Tokyo MX 
 

1970 manga
1972 anime television series debuts
1981 anime television series debuts
Animated television series about frogs
Bandai Visual
Comedy anime and manga
Nippon TV dramas
Nippon TV original programming
Shueisha franchises
Shueisha manga
Shōnen manga
TBS Television (Japan) original programming
TMS Entertainment
Television shows written by Yoshikazu Okada